Beth Bronger-Jones is an American curler from Seattle, Washington. She is a United States women's champion (1987) and mixed champion (1985).

Teams

Women's

Mixed

References

External links

Living people
American female curlers
American curling champions
Sportspeople from Seattle
Year of birth missing (living people)
Place of birth missing (living people)